Tomas may refer to:

People
 Tomás (given name), a Spanish, Portuguese, and Gaelic given name
 Tomas (given name), a Swedish, Dutch, and Lithuanian given name
 Tomáš, a Czech and Slovak given name
 Tomas (surname), a French and Croatian surname
 Tomás (surname), a Spanish and Portuguese surname
 Tomaš (surname), a Croatian surname
 Tomas., taxonomic author abbreviation of Ruggero Tomaselli (1920–1982), Italian botanist

Places
 Tomaš, Croatia, a village near Bjelovar
 Tomaș River, a tributary of the Gârbăul Mare River in Romania
 Tomas District, Peru

Other uses
 Tropical Storm Tomas (disambiguation), numerous storms
 Tomas (novel), 2009 novel by James Palumbo
 Convento de Santo Tomás (Madrid)

See also
 Thomas (disambiguation)
 Tom (disambiguation)